This is a list of concert tours of South Korean girl group Itzy.

Checkmate World Tour 

Checkmate World Tour is the first worldwide concert tour by South Korean girl group Itzy, held in support of the group's fifth Korean extended play Checkmate (2022). It began on August 6, 2022, in Seoul, South Korea and is planned to have 17 shows across Asia and North America.

Background
JYP Entertainment announced on June 2, 2022, that Itzy would be returning with new music in July, which will then be followed-up by their first world tour in support of the new release. The post featured a promotion scheduler with details of the upcoming EP titled Checkmate, as well as a partial schedule of the tour. On June 22, 2022, it was announced that the second show in Seoul (August 7) will be live-streamed  and will be restreamed on (September 4) via Beyond Live. On October 17, four additional dates in Southeast Asia were announced, followed by the addition of a second show in Manila for January 15.

Setlist
The section below contains the setlist of the concert.

{{hidden
| headercss = background: #ccccff; font-size: 100%; width: 65%;
| contentcss = text-align: left; font-size: 100%; width: 65%;
| header = Seoul (August 6 - 7, 2022)
| content =

Act 1
Interlude I 
 "In the Morning"  (MAMA ver.)
 "Sorry Not Sorry" (MAMA ver.)
 "Shoot!"
 "What I Want"
 "365"
 "Boss Bitch" (Ryujin cover)
 "Cherry"
 "Icy"
 "Free Fall"
 "#Twenty"
 "Maniac" (Yuna cover)
 "Red" (Lia cover)

Act 2
Interlude II 
 "Wannabe"
 "Dalla Dalla" 
 "Sneakers"

Act 3
Interlude III 
  "Bloodline" (Chaeryeong cover)
 "Hotter than Hell" (Yeji cover)

Act 4
Interlude IV 
 "Want It?"
 "Nobody Like You"
 "Loco"(shortened)
 "Not Shy"(extended and live ver.)
Encore
  "Domino"
 "Trust Me (MIDZY)" (English Version)
 "It'z Summer"
 "Be in Love"
}}
{{hidden
| headercss = background: #ccccff; font-size: 100%; width: 65%;
| contentcss = text-align: left; font-size: 100%; width: 65%;
| header = North America (October 26, 2022 - November 13, 2022)
| content =

Act 1
Interlude I 
 "In the Morning"  (MAMA ver.)
 "Sorry Not Sorry" (MAMA ver.)
 "Shoot!"
 "What I Want"
 "365"
 "Boss Bitch" (Ryujin cover)
 "Cherry"
 "Icy"
 "Free Fall"
 "#Twenty"
 "Maniac" (Yuna cover)
 "Red" (Lia cover)

Act 2
Interlude II 
 "Wannabe"
 "Dalla Dalla" 
 "Sneakers"

Act 3
Interlude III 
  "Bloodline" (Chaeryeong cover)
 "Hotter than Hell" (Yeji cover)

Act 4
Interlude IV 
  "Boys Like You"
 "Nobody Like You"
 "Loco"(shortened)
 "Not Shy"(extended and live ver.)
Encore
  "Domino"
 "Trust Me (MIDZY)" (English Version)
 "It'z Summer"
 "Be in Love"
}}
{{hidden
| headercss = background: #ccccff; font-size: 100%; width: 65%;
| contentcss = text-align: left; font-size: 100%; width: 65%;
| header = Asia (Except Seoul and Japan)
| content =

Act 1
Interlude I
 "In the Morning"  (MAMA ver.)
 "Sorry Not Sorry" (MAMA ver.)
 "Shoot!"
 "What I Want"
 "365"
 "Boss Bitch" (Ryujin cover)
 "Cherry"
 "Icy"
 "Free Fall"
 "#Twenty"
 "Maniac" (Yuna cover)
 "Red" (Lia cover)

Act 2
Interlude II
 "Wannabe"
 "Dalla Dalla" 
 "Sneakers"

Act 3
Interlude III 
  "Bloodline" (Chaeryeong cover)
 "Hotter than Hell" (Yeji cover)

Act 4
Interlude IV 
  "Cheshire"
 "Loco"(shortened)
 "Not Shy"(extended and live ver.)

Encore
  "Domino"
 "Trust Me (MIDZY)"  (Taipei - Chinese version)
 "Boys Like You"
 "Nobody Like You"
}}

{{hidden
| headercss = background: #ccccff; font-size: 100%; width: 65%;
| contentcss = text-align: left; font-size: 100%; width: 65%;
| header = Japan
| content =

Act 1
Interlude I
 "In the Morning"  (MAMA ver.)
 "Sorry Not Sorry" (MAMA ver.)
 "Shoot!"
 "Voltage"
 "Boss Bitch" (Ryujin cover)
 "Blah Blah Blah"
 "Icy"
 "Free Fall"
 "#Twenty"
 "Maniac" (Yuna cover)
 "Red" (Lia cover)

Act 2
Interlude II
 "Wannabe"
 "Dalla Dalla" 
 "Sneakers"

Act 3
Interlude III 
  "Bloodline" (Chaeryeong cover)
 "Hotter than Hell" (Yeji cover)

Act 4
Interlude IV 
  "Cheshire"
 "Loco"(shortened)
 "Not Shy"(extended and live ver.)

Encore
  "Domino"
 "Trust Me (MIDZY)"  (Japanese version)
 "It'z Summer"
 "Boys Like You"
 "Nobody Like You"
}}

Tour dates

Showcases

Itzy 'It'z Different' Debut Showcase 
Itzy started promoting It'z Different in the live broadcast "The 1st Single Live Premiere" on Naver V Live in which they performed "Dalla Dalla" for the first time.

Itzy Premiere Showcase Tour 'Itzy? Itzy!'

Notes

References 

Itzy
Itzy